Baye  is a small town and commune in the Cercle of Bankass in the Mopti Region of Mali. In 1998 the commune had a population of 21,859.

References

Communes of Mopti Region